Rolling papers are small sheets, rolls, or leaves of paper which are sold for rolling cigarettes either by hand or with a rolling machine. When rolling a cigarette, one fills the rolling paper with tobacco, cannabis, cloves, damiana, hash or other herbs. The paper for holding the tobacco blend may vary in porosity to allow ventilation of the burning ember or contain materials that control the burning rate of the cigarette and stability of the produced ash.
Civil War re-enactors often use cigarette rolling papers to make combustible cartridges for cap & ball rifles and revolvers.

Rolling papers 
Notable rolling papers include the following

Gallery

See also
 Smoking
 Tobacco industry

References

External links
 

 
Lists of brands
Rolling papers